The Koteshwar Dam is a gravity dam on the Bhagirathi River, located  downstream of the Tehri Dam in Tehri District, Uttarakhand, India. The dam is part of the Tehri Hydropower Complex and serves to regulate the Tehri Dam's tailrace for irrigation and create the lower reservoir of the Tehri Pumped Storage Power Station. In addition, the dam has a 400 MW (4x100 MW) run-of-the-river power station. The project was approved in 2000 and its first generator was commissioned on 27 March 2011, the second on 30 March 2011. The construction site had been inundated in September 2010 by floods. The diversion tunnel was later blocked heaving/collapse of the hill in December 2010. The spillway was commissioned in Jan, 2011. The last two generators were made operational in March 2012.

Design
The dam's power station is a run-of-the-river type and uses the active storage in the reservoir which can draw the lake down  from full pool. The power house is located on the right bank of the river below the dam and contains 4 x 100 MW Francis turbine-generators. The height of the dam allows for a maximum  of hydraulic head.

See also

List of power stations in India
List of run-of-the-river hydroelectric power stations

References

Dams completed in 2011
Energy infrastructure completed in 2011
Dams in Uttarakhand
Hydroelectric power stations in Uttarakhand
Gravity dams
Run-of-the-river power stations
Dams on the Bhagirathi River
2011 establishments in Uttarakhand